Giovanni Varglien (16 May 1911 – 16 October 1990), also known as Varglien II, was an Italian football manager and player from Fiume who played as a midfielder.

Club career
Varglien played the majority of his club football for Juventus in Italy, also playing one season with his hometown club Fiumana, as well as Palermo.

International career
Varglien represented the Italy national football team on three occasions between 1936 and 1937.

Personal life
Giovanni's older brother Mario Varglien, also played for Juventus at the same time and was a World Cup winner with Italy.

Honours
Juventus
Serie A: 1930–31, 1931–32, 1932–33, 1933–34, 1934–35
Coppa Italia: 1937–38, 1941–42

Palermo
Serie B: 1947–48

References

External links
 

1911 births
1990 deaths
Footballers from Rijeka
People from Rijeka
Italian footballers
Italian Austro-Hungarians
Association football midfielders
Italy international footballers
Serie A players
Serie B players
U.S. Fiumana players
HNK Rijeka players
Juventus F.C. players
Palermo F.C. players
Italian football managers
Italian expatriate football managers
Palermo F.C. managers
Atalanta B.C. managers
L.R. Vicenza managers
Turkey national football team managers
A.S.D. La Biellese managers